Fourth Corner Exchange Inc is a sustainable community currency based in the Pacific Northwest United States, founded in 2002 by Francis Ayley and a group of like minded friends. Fourth Corner Exchange started trading in January 2004, utilizing a basic Time-based currency system which has some features of Local exchange trading systems. There are presently over five-hundred and fifty members in Bellingham, Washington, Port Townsend, Washington, Everett, Washington, Mount Vernon, Washington, and Portland, Oregon. Prospective members must attend a new members meeting in order to join and trade with other members. Meetings are held in Bellingham, Port Townsend, Mount Vernon, Everett, Portland and many other locations.

Fourth Corner Exchange has spread to other parts of the USA, notably Oregon, California, New Mexico, Colorado and Ohio.

The original software used to run Fourth Corner's website has been released under the GNU General Public License (GPL) and is distributed through SourceForge. The Fourth Corner Exchange database program has been significantly modified since this open source release.

External links

 Fourth Corner Exchange Inc. (official site)
 Local Exchange software (via SourceForge)
 Local Currencies - Replacing Scarcity with Trust, a video interview with Fourth Corner founder Francis Ayley.

Organizations established in 2002
Local currencies
Economy of Port Townsend, Washington
2002 establishments in Washington (state)